The 2020–21 Coppin State Eagles men's basketball team represented Coppin State University in the 2020–21 NCAA Division I men's basketball season. The Eagles, led by fourth-year head coach Juan Dixon, played their home games at the Physical Education Complex in Baltimore, Maryland as members of the Mid-Eastern Athletic Conference. With the creation of divisions to cut down on travel due to the COVID-19 pandemic, they played in the Northern Division.

Previous season
The Eagles finished the 2019–20 season 11–20, 7–9 in MEAC play to finish in seventh place. They were scheduled to play against Norfolk State in the quarterfinals of the MEAC tournament, but the remainder of the tournament was cancelled due to the ongoing COVID-19 pandemic.

Roster

Schedule and results 

|-
!colspan=12 style=| Non-conference regular season

|-
!colspan=12 style=| MEAC regular season

|-
!colspan=12 style=| MEAC tournament
|-

|-

Sources

References

Coppin State Eagles men's basketball seasons
Coppin State Eagles
Coppin State Eagles men's basketball
Coppin State Eagles men's basketball